The Price of Possession is a lost 1921 American silent romantic drama film directed by Hugh Ford and starring Ethel Clayton. It was produced by Jesse Lasky.

Cast
Ethel Clayton as Helen Carston
Rockliffe Fellowes as Jim Barston, A Bushrider / Jim Barston, Heir to Barston Manor
Maude Turner Gordon as Lady Dawnay
Reginald Denny as Robert Dawnay
Clarence Heritage as Lord Dawnay
George Backus as Samuel Poore
Isabel West as Mrs. Poore
Pearl Shepard as Eva Poore
Dorothy Hall as Minister's Daughter

References

External links

Lantern slide

1921 films
American silent feature films
Lost American films
Films directed by Hugh Ford
1921 romantic drama films
American romantic drama films
American black-and-white films
1920s American films
Silent romantic drama films
Silent American drama films